Nausinoella is a genus of moths of the family Crambidae. It contains only one species, Nausinoella aphrospila, which is found on the Comoros and Seychelles (Aldabra), as well as in the Democratic Republic of Congo, Rwanda and  Zimbabwe.

References

Spilomelinae
Crambidae genera
Taxa named by Eugene G. Munroe